Events from the year 1489 in Ireland.

Incumbent
Lord: Henry VII

Events
 John Lynch becomes the fifth Mayor of Galway

References